Pendlimarri is a village in Kadapa district of the Indian state of Andhra Pradesh. It is located in Pendlimarri mandal of Kadapa revenue division. The former sarpanch of Pendlimarri is maddali siva reddy. The MPTC of Pendlimarri Ms. Yarasu Nagamma w/o Yarasu Nagamalla Reddy.

References 

Villages in Kadapa district